A round-robin story, or simply "round robin," is a type of collaborative fiction or storytelling in which a number of authors write chapters of a novel or pieces of a story, in rounds. Round-robin novels were invented in the 19th century, and later became a tradition particularly in science fiction. In modern usage, the term often applies to collaborative fan fiction, particularly on the Internet, though it can also refer to friends or family telling stories at a sleepover, around a campfire, etc.

See also

 Addventure, which combines the round robin method with gamebook narrative form
 Exquisite Corpse

External links
The Internet Story Tale
FoldingStory | The Group Storytelling Game
The High Hat - Collaborative literature
Ensemble Press - an online game of round-robin
AskOuija - A subreddit where answers are generated one letter at a time

Collaborative fiction
Literary concepts
19th-century introductions